"Chapter 25" is the sixth episode of the third season of the American cable television series Legion, based on the Marvel Comics character David Haller, and connected to the X-Men film series. It is the 25th overall episode of the series and was written by series creator Noah Hawley and directed by executive producer John Cameron. It originally aired on FX on July 29, 2019.

The series follows David Haller, a "mutant" diagnosed with schizophrenia at a young age. Struggling to differentiate reality from fantasy, Haller tries to control his mutant powers and the sinister forces trying to control them while evading a government agency, Division 3. Summerland and Division 3 eventually team up in order to catch Amahl Farouk from finding his original body. While Farouk was captured, David is now labeled as a threat and hunted down, prompting him to escape. In the episode, Syd's mind has manifested as a baby in the astral plane, where she is adopted by Oliver and Melanie Bird.

According to Nielsen Media Research, the episode was seen by an estimated 0.332 million household viewers and gained a 0.1 ratings share among adults aged 18–49. The episode received generally positive reviews from critics, who praised the character development and the rap battle sequence, although some expressed criticism for the pacing and lack of progress with the previous episodes.

Plot
In the astral plane, Oliver (Jemaine Clement) and Melanie (Jean Smart) live in a hut. One day, Oliver finds a baby in the fields and they both decide to adopt her. They are also often disturbed by a man named Jerome (Jason Mantzoukas), also known as The Wolf, a person whose presence seem to annoy everyone, who also found a woman named Cynthia (Samantha Cormier). Oliver and Melanie decide to adopt Cynthia to help her lost "innocence".

As time passes, the baby grows into a child, with both her and Cynthia constantly being tempted by The Wolf, but not falling for his tricks. The child is constantly haunted by nightmares, result of the real world's influence. To avoid the Wolf, they move into the city, although Cynthia has fallen for The Wolf. The child now becomes the teenage version of Syd, who is struggling to find her place in the world. She runs into Cynthia, who tries to get her to join The Wolf, which Syd refuses. Syd then tells Oliver and Melanie that she wants to save Cynthia, so Oliver decides to help her.

Syd and Oliver go to the Wolf's lair, where they take Cynthia to their house. However, The Wolf has followed them, prompting Oliver and The Wolf to engage in a rap battle. Olivers wins the rap battle, although Cynthia still willingly goes with The Wolf, much to Syd's disappointment. Oliver and Melanie tell Syd that they prepared her for this life, encouraging to return to the real world, just as she grows into her adult version (Rachel Keller). She awakens in the airship, finding that Switch's doorway is malfunctioning, although she is unable to enter.

Syd meets with Cary (Bill Irwin) and Kerry (Amber Midthunder), telling them she can stop David and Switch. Cary creates bracelets for each other, which will allow them to enter the doorway. Before entering, Kerry asks Cary to transfer her wounds to him so she can fight, which he accepts to do. As the time demons appear, Syd, Cary and Kerry enter the doorway, which finally closes.

Production

Development
In July 2019, it was reported that the sixth episode of the season would be titled "Chapter 25", and was to be directed by executive producer John Cameron and written by series creator Noah Hawley. This was Hawley's seventeenth writing credit, and Cameron's third directing credit.

Filming
The episode featured a rap battle sequence, where Oliver and The Wolf performed at a night club dream sequence. The idea wasn't originally planned by Hawley while writing the script, although he commented that "I would be depriving his [Jemaine] fans and my audience of a golden opportunity if I didn't take this seriously." Hawley wrote the rap lyrics as a placeholder, assuming that they would later change them, but Clement liked it enough, "But he did it, happily, and had no real complaints. I said if you want to re-write this at all, feel free. He changed very little, we filmed it, and it's one of my favorite things ever."

Reception

Viewers
In its original American broadcast, "Chapter 25" was seen by an estimated 0.332 million household viewers and gained a 0.1 ratings share among adults aged 18–49, according to Nielsen Media Research. This means that 0.1 percent of all households with televisions watched the episode. This was a 15% increase in viewership from the previous episode, which was watched by 0.288 million viewers with a 0.1 in the 18-49 demographics.

Critical reviews
"Chapter 25" received generally positive reviews from critics. The review aggregator website Rotten Tomatoes reported a 80% approval rating with an average rating of 7.8/10 for the episode, based on 5 reviews.

Alex McLevy of The A.V. Club gave the episode a "B+" grade and wrote, "The rap battle between Oliver and Jerome is maybe the single silliest thing Legion has ever done. Sillier than a lip-synching mouse, sillier than any droll witticism or stomping on a previously enormous delusion creature or any of it. On an episode already experimenting with a far lighter and more playful tone than just about every episode that's preceded it, it pushed the series into a downright goofy realm. But circumstances aside, if you can't enjoy a ridiculous rap battle between Jemaine Clement and Jason Mantzoukas, I'm not sure I want to know you."

Nick Harley of Den of Geek gave the episode a 2.5 star rating out of 5 wrote, "'Chapter 25' is going to make a certain type of Legion fan very happy, just not this one. One person's delightful experiment is another's fanciful slog. To each their own. I thought 'Chapter 24' turned the action and urgency of the season up to 11, and this episode halted that momentum dead in its tracks with a self-satisfied detour filled with metaphor and little else. At least like the foot looks to be back on the pedal next week." Kevin Lever of Tell Tale TV gave the episode a 4 star rating out of 5 and wrote, "'Chapter 25 provides Syd the answer she's been seeking this whole time. It does so with a fantastic hour of self-discovery told with returning characters long missed."

References

External links
 

Legion (TV series) episodes
2019 American television episodes
Television episodes written by Noah Hawley